Tell Shaikh Hassan al Rai is an archaeological site 2km south of el Marj, 2 km north of Hoch Harime in the Beqaa Mohafazat (Governorate) in Lebanon. It dates at least to the Neolithic with Medieval material also attested.

Tell Shaikh Hassan al Rai is famous for being the site of the first unquestioned evidence of the domestication of cats, after archaeologists found remains dating from the Uruk period (5500-5000 BCE) of cats smaller in size than the wildcat.

References

Baalbek District
Neolithic settlements
Archaeological sites in Lebanon
Great Rift Valley